This problem was given in India by the mathematician Brahmagupta in 628 AD in his treatise Brahma Sputa Siddhanta:

Solve the Pell's equation
 
for integers .

Brahmagupta gave the smallest solution as
 .

See also
Brahmagupta
Indian mathematics
List of Indian mathematicians
Pell's equation
Indeterminate equation
Diophantine equation

External links

Brahmagupta
Diophantine equations